A homograph (from the , homós, "same" and γράφω, gráphō, "write") is a word that shares the same written form as another word but has a different meaning. However, some dictionaries insist that the words must also be pronounced differently, while the Oxford English Dictionary says that the words should also be of "different origin". In this vein, The Oxford Guide to Practical Lexicography lists various types of homographs, including those in which the words are discriminated by being in a different word class, such as hit, the verb to strike, and hit, the noun a blow.

If, when spoken, the meanings may be distinguished by different pronunciations, the words are also heteronyms. Words with the same writing and pronunciation (i.e. are both homographs and homophones) are considered homonyms. However, in a broader sense the term "homonym" may be applied to words with the same writing or pronunciation. Homograph disambiguation is critically important in speech synthesis, natural language processing and other fields. Identically written different senses of what is judged to be fundamentally the same word are called polysemes; for example, wood (substance) and wood (area covered with trees).

In English
Examples:
sow (verb)  – to plant seed
sow (noun)  – female pig
where the two words are spelt identically but pronounced differently. Here confusion is not possible in spoken language but could occur in written language.

bear (verb) – to support or carry
bear (noun) –  the animal
where the words are identical in spelling and pronunciation, but differ in meaning and grammatical function. These are called homonyms.

More examples

In Chinese

Old Chinese
Modern study of Old Chinese has found patterns that suggest a system of affixes. One pattern is the addition of the prefix , which turns transitive verbs into intransitive or passives in some cases:

Another pattern is the use of a  suffix, which seems to create nouns from verbs or verbs from nouns:

Middle Chinese
Many homographs in Old Chinese also exist in Middle Chinese. Examples of homographs in Middle Chinese are:

Modern Chinese
Many homographs in Old Chinese and Middle Chinese also exist in modern Chinese varieties. Homographs which did not exist in Old Chinese or Middle Chinese often come into existence due to differences between literary and colloquial readings of Chinese characters. Other homographs may have been created due to merging two different characters into the same glyph during script reform (See Simplified Chinese characters and Shinjitai).

Some examples of homographs in Cantonese from Middle Chinese are:

See also

 Synonym
 Interlingual homograph
 IDN homograph attack
 Syncretism (linguistics)
 False friend

References

External links 

Word play
Orthography